The Philippines competed at the 27th Southeast Asian Games held in Naypyidaw, the capital of Myanmar, as well as in two other main cities, Yangon and Mandalay. from 11 to 22 December 2013

Preparation
According to Richie Garcia, the chairman of the Philippine Sports Commission (PSC), the 2013 SEA games has to give more attention due to criticism of the country's delegation to the London Olympic Games which was allegedly influenced by the “Have money, will travel,” scheme. Composed of about 148 athletes, the Philippines' delegation to the SEA games includes a former medalist of SEA games in Palembang Indonesia.

After the exclusion of Olympic sports, the inclusion of indigenous sports such as vovinam, kempo and chinlone and the number of gold medals allotted was increased on sports where the host Myanmar deemed to have better chances of winning like dragon boat, the Philippines has decided to send a "token delegation" to Myanmar.

The Philippine Olympic Committee, has set criteria to determine which athletes would be sent to the games. The committee used a gold medal criteria in its selection process. The committee insists that funding would not boost one team's bid to be included in the country's official delegation to the games. The Philippine Olympic Committee and Philippine Sports Commission did not gave the greenlight for the participation of the country's national u-23 football team due to “lack of international friendlies” base their qualifications on, drawing criticism. The women's football team was allowed to participate in the tournament.

Expectations
Philippine Sports Commission chairman Richie Garcia expects the country to win at least 25 medals. The country's top officials sees a number of sports such as athletics, boxing, sailing, weightlifting and wushu as potential sources for gold. Despite the low number of delegation the country has seen in years, Philippine Olympic Committee chairman Jose Cojuangco, expects the same finish for the country's representatives. He refuted criticisms on the number of delegates and insists that it is about the quality of athletes and not the number of athletes being sent to the games.

Broadcasting
ABS-CBN was named the sole official broadcaster of the games in the Philippines, after the successful broadcast. But due to the expensive and non-free TV rights coming from Myanmar (The previous edition of the Games TV rights were free), the network only decided to air Basketball Men`s and Football Women's on a delayed basis. Other events including the Ceremonies were not aired. Studio 23 aired the games, which eventually closed down a month after and also one probable cause to free all airtime in the channel before shutting down.

Medalists

Gold

Silver

Bronze

Medal summary

By sports

References

Nations at the 2013 Southeast Asian Games
2013 in Philippine sport
2013